Dampierre is a commune in the Jura department in Bourgogne-Franche-Comté in eastern France. On 1 January 2019, the former commune Le Petit-Mercey was merged into Dampierre.

Population

See also 
 Communes of the Jura department

References 

Communes of Jura (department)